In functional analysis, a branch of mathematics, the Baskakov operators are generalizations of Bernstein polynomials, Szász–Mirakyan operators, and Lupas operators. They are defined by

.

 is completely monotone, i.e. .
There is an integer  such that  whenever 
They are named after V. A. Baskakov, who studied their convergence to bounded, continuous functions.

Basic results
The Baskakov operators are linear and positive.

References

Footnotes

Approximation theory